Fo Shan Ting Da Bo Gong Temple is a Chinese temple in Singapore located in Pulau Ubin.

History
The temple was founded in 1869.  In 2010, the temple began a fundraising campaign in order to rebuild the temple.

The temple holds a six-day celebration to celebrate the birthday of Tua Pek Kong.

News articles

References

Chinese-Singaporean culture
Temples in Singapore